Vincent Lionel Arthur (23 March 1905 – 6 November 1970) was an Australian rules footballer who played with Carlton and St Kilda in the Victorian Football League (VFL).

Notes

References

External links 

 
 
 Vin Arthur's profile at Blueseum.
 Vin Arthur's profile at The VFA Project.

1905 births
1970 deaths
Australian rules footballers from Melbourne
Australian Rules footballers: place kick exponents
St Kilda Football Club players
Carlton Football Club players
Preston Football Club (VFA) players
People from Prahran, Victoria